Zdeněk Hedrlín (1933 – April 22, 2018) was a Czech mathematician, specializing in universal algebra and combinatorial theory, both in pure and applied mathematics.

Zdeněk Hedrlín received his PhD from Prague's Charles University in 1963. His thesis on commutative semigroups was supervised by Miroslav Katětov. Hedrlín held the title of Docent (associated professor) at Charles University. There he worked at the Faculty of Mathematics and Physics for over 60 years until he died at age 85. He was among the first Czech mathematicians to do research on category theory. 

In 1970 Hedrlín was an Invited Speaker at the International Congress of Mathematicians in Nice. In the later part of his career, he focused on applications of relational structures and led very successful special and interdisciplinary seminars. Applications to biological cell behavior earned him and his students a European grant. (He and his students worked on computational cell models of cancer.)

Hedrlín was a member of the editorial board of the Journal of Pure and Applied Algebra. His Erdős number is 1. His doctoral students include Vojtěch Rödl.

Selected publication
 
 
 
 
 
 
 
 
  (over 160 citations)

References

20th-century Czech mathematicians
21st-century Czech mathematicians
Czech mathematicians
Category theorists
Combinatorialists
Charles University alumni
Academic staff of Charles University
1933 births
2018 deaths